Cyclosia is a genus of zygaenid moth that has a mimicry complex with the milkweed butterfly.

Selected species
Cyclosia distanti (Druce, 1891)
Cyclosia midamia (Herrich-Schäffer, [1853])
Cyclosia panthona (Stoll, [1780])
Cyclosia papilionaris (Drury, 1773)
Cyclosia pieridoides Walker, 1862

References

External links

Chalcosiinae
Zygaenidae genera